The 2007 Speed World Challenge season was the 18th season of the SCCA Pro Racing Speed World Challenge. It began on March 16 at Sebring International Raceway and ended October 21 at Mazda Raceway Laguna Seca.

Schedule

Results

References

External links
The SPEED World Challenge's official website
SCCA Pro Racing
Roster

Speed World Challenge
GT World Challenge America